Charles Steven Cox (born October 31, 1974) is an American former professional baseball first baseman. He played in Major League Baseball (MLB) for the Tampa Bay Devil Rays and in Nippon Professional Baseball (NPB) for the Yokohama BayStars.

Career
Cox attended Monache High School in Porterville, California, graduating in 1992. was chosen in the fifth round of the 1992 Major League Baseball Draft by the Oakland Athletics. He played in their organization for six seasons without appearing in the major leagues. He was selected by the Devil Rays with the 46th pick in the 1997 MLB Expansion Draft.

Cox was first called up to  MLB on September 17, along with Jim Morris.

In 2007, Cox became the head coach for Porterville College.

References

External links

1974 births
Living people
American expatriate baseball players in Canada
American expatriate baseball players in Japan
Arizona League Athletics players
Baseball players from California
Durham Bulls players
Edmonton Trappers players
Huntsville Stars players
Major League Baseball first basemen
Modesto A's players
Nippon Professional Baseball first basemen
Orlando Rays players
People from Delano, California
Southern Oregon A's players
Tampa Bay Devil Rays players
West Michigan Whitecaps players
Yokohama BayStars players